The Young Rebels is an American adventure TV series that was broadcast by ABC as part of its 1970 fall lineup on Sunday night at 7:00 p.m Eastern time.

Plot
The Young Rebels was the story of a group of youthful guerrillas fighting on the Patriot side in the American Revolutionary War (a.k.a. The War of American Independence).  They were part of the fictional "Yankee Doodle Society", based in Chester, Pennsylvania, in 1777.  Their goal was to harass the British forces however they could and serve as spies for the rebels.  The four main characters were Jeremy (Richard Ely), son of the mayor of Chester, Isak (Louis Gossett Jr.), a former slave, Henry (Alex Henteloff), a bright young, bespectacled man who looked a lot (by design) like a younger Benjamin Franklin, whom he greatly admired, and Elizabeth (Hilary Thompson), Jeremy's even-younger girlfriend.  Any parallel between this "youth movement" and the one going on in the United States in real life at the same time that this show was aired was completely intentional.  Aiding these young American rebels in their cause was a young French rebel, the Marquis de Lafayette (Philippe Forquet), who had come to their aid not just because he believed in their cause but also to learn how to export many of its principles to his native France.

Cast
Richard Ely as Jeremy Larkin
Hilary Thompson as Elizabeth Coates
Louis Gossett Jr. as Isak Poole
Alex Henteloff as Henry Abington
Philippe Forquet as General the Marquis de Lafayette

Reception
The Young Rebels was up against the very popular family shows Lassie and The Wonderful World of Disney on competitors CBS and NBC respectively. Rick Ely and Philippe Forquet became teenage idols and were widely featured in movie and fan magazines. Despite extensive promotion and a large (by television standards of the era) production budget, The Young Rebels failed to garner enough of an audience and was canceled at midseason.

Episodes

Further reading
Brooks, Tim and Marsh, Earle, The Complete Directory to Prime Time Network and Cable TV Shows

See also
 List of television series and miniseries about the American Revolution
 List of films about the American Revolution

References

External links
 
 
 The Young Rebels Fan Site
 The Young Rebels Fan Fiction

1970 American television series debuts
1971 American television series endings
American Broadcasting Company original programming
Television series about the American Revolution
Television series by Screen Gems
English-language television shows
Television series by Sony Pictures Television
Television shows set in Pennsylvania